The Busyconidae are  taxonomic family of large sea snails, often known as whelks.

Subfamilies
 Busyconinae Wade, 1917 (1867)
 Busycotypinae Petuch, 1994
 Busycotypus Wenz, 1943
 Fulguropsis Marks, 1950

References

 Wade, B. (1917). An Upper Cretaceous Fulgur. American Journal of Science. ser. 4, 43: 293-297.
 Petuch E.J., Myers R.F. & Berschauer D.P. (2015). The living and fossil Busycon whelks: Iconic mollusks of eastern North America. San Diego Shell Club. viii + 195 pp

External links
  Kantor, Y.I., Fedosov, A.E., Kosyan, A.R., Puillandre, N., Sorokin, P.A., Kano, Y., Clark, R. N. & Bouchet, P. (2022) (nomenclatural availability: 2021). Molecular phylogeny and revised classification of the Buccinoidea (Neogastropoda). Zoological Journal of the Linnean Society. 194: 789-857